Cochlostoma elegans is a land snail species in the genus Cochlostoma. It is found on the island of Pag in Croatia.

References

External links 
 

Cyclophoroidea
Gastropods described in 1879